Tonic Chabalala (born 25 April 1979 in Giyani) is a South African football (soccer) defender formerly for Orlando Pirates in the Premier Soccer League.

He captained the Orlando Pirates side which reached the semi-finals of the 2006 CAF Champions League.

He is the cousin of fellow footballer Justice Chabalala.

References

1979 births
Living people
People from Greater Giyani Local Municipality
Soccer players from Limpopo

South African soccer players
Association football defenders
Orlando Pirates F.C. players
Dynamos F.C. (South Africa) players
South African Premier Division players